Marcella R. Frevert (born October 26, 1937) was the Iowa State Representative from the 7th District. She served in the Iowa House of Representatives from 1996 through 2011.  She received her AA from Emmetsburg Junior College, her BS from Minnesota State University, Mankato, and her MA from the University of Northern Iowa.

Frevert currently serves on several committees in the Iowa House – the Agriculture committee; the Ways and Means committee; and the Environmental Protection committee, where she is vice chair.  She also serves on the Education Appropriations Subcommittee.

Frevert was re-elected in 2006 with 7,335 votes, running unopposed.

References

External links
 Representative Marcella Frevert official Iowa General Assembly site
 
 Financial information (state office) at the National Institute for Money in State Politics

Democratic Party members of the Iowa House of Representatives
Living people
Women state legislators in Iowa
1937 births
Minnesota State University, Mankato alumni
University of Northern Iowa alumni
People from Emmetsburg, Iowa
21st-century American women